Kuwait City is the capital and largest city of Kuwait. Located at the heart of the country on the south shore of Kuwait Bay on the Persian Gulf, it is the political, cultural and economical centre of the emirate, containing Kuwait's Seif Palace, government offices, and the headquarters of most Kuwaiti corporations and banks. It is one of the hottest cities in summer on earth, with average summer high temperatures over 45 °C (113 °F) for three months of the year.

As of 2018, the metropolitan area had roughly 3 million inhabitants (more than 70% of the country's population). The city itself has no administrative status. All six governorates of the country comprise parts of the urban agglomeration, which is subdived in numerous areas. In a more narrow sense, Kuwait City can also refer only to the town's historic core, which nowadays is part of the Capital Governorate and seamlessly merges with the adjacent urban areas.

Kuwait City's trade and transportation needs are served by Kuwait International Airport, Mina Al-Shuwaik (Shuwaik Port) and Mina Al Ahmadi (Ahmadi Port).

History

In 1613, the town of Kuwait was founded in modern-day Kuwait City as a fishing village inhabited by fishermen. In 1716, the Bani Utubs settled in Kuwait. At the time of the arrival of the Utubs, Kuwait was still inhabited by a few fishermen and primarily functioned as a fishing village. In the eighteenth century, Kuwait prospered and rapidly became the principal commercial center for the transit of goods between India, Muscat, Baghdad and Arabia. By the mid 1700s, Kuwait had already established itself as the major trading route from the Persian Gulf to Aleppo.

During the Persian siege of Basra in 1775–1779, Iraqi merchants took refuge in Kuwait and were partly instrumental in the expansion of Kuwait's boat-building and trading activities. As a result, Kuwait's maritime commerce boomed. Between the years 1775 and 1779, the Indian trade routes with Baghdad, Aleppo, Smyrna and Constantinople were diverted to Kuwait. The East India Company was diverted to Kuwait in 1792. The East India Company secured the sea routes between Kuwait, India and the east coasts of Africa. After the Persian  withdrawal  from Basra in 1779, Kuwait continued to attract trade away from Basra.

Kuwait was the center of boat building in the Persian Gulf region. During the late eighteenth and nineteenth centuries, ship vessels made in Kuwait carried the bulk of trade between the ports of India, East Africa and the Red Sea. Kuwaiti ship vessels were renowned throughout the Indian Ocean. Regional geopolitical turbulence helped foster economic prosperity in Kuwait in the second half of the 18th century. Kuwait became prosperous due to Basra's instability in the late 18th century. In the late 18th century, Kuwait partly functioned as a haven for Basra's merchants fleeing Ottoman government persecution. According to Palgrave, Kuwaitis developed a reputation as the best sailors in the Persian Gulf.

During the reign of Mubarak Al-Sabah, Kuwait was dubbed the "Marseilles of the Gulf" because its economic vitality attracted a large variety of people. In the first decades of the twentieth century, Kuwait had a well-established elite: wealthy trading families who were linked by marriage and shared economic interests.

In 1937, Freya Stark wrote about the extent of poverty in Kuwait at the time:Poverty has settled in Kuwait more heavily since my last visit five years ago, both by sea, where the pearl trade continues to decline, and by land, where the blockade established by Saudi Arabia now harms the merchants.
Some prominent merchant families left Kuwait in the early 1930s due to the prevalence of economic hardship. At the time of the discovery of oil in 1937, most of Kuwait's inhabitants were impoverished.

From 1946 to 1982, Kuwait experienced a period of prosperity driven by oil and its liberal atmosphere. In popular discourse, the years between 1946 and 1982 are referred to as the "Golden Era". In 1950, a major public-work programme began to enable Kuwaitis to enjoy a modern standard of living. By 1952, the country became the largest oil exporter in the Persian Gulf region.  In the following year, the country's annual oil income grew to $169 million. This massive growth attracted many foreign workers, especially from Palestine, Egypt and India and helped finance the development of a new master plan, which the state approved in 1952. In June 1961, Kuwait became independent with the end of the British protectorate and the sheikh Abdullah Al-Salim Al-Sabah became an Emir. Under the terms of the newly drafted constitution, Kuwait held its first parliamentary elections in 1963. Kuwait was the first Persian Gulf country to establish a constitution and parliament.

In the 1960s and 1970s, Kuwait was the most developed country in the region. Kuwait was the pioneer in the Middle East in diversifying its earnings away from oil exports. The Kuwait Investment Authority is the world's first sovereign wealth fund. From the 1970s onward, Kuwait scored highest of all Arab countries on the Human Development Index. Kuwait University was established in 1966. Kuwait's theatre industry was well-known throughout the Arab world. In the 1960s and 1970s, Kuwait's press was described as one of the freest in the world. Kuwait was the pioneer in the literary renaissance in the Arab region. In 1958, Al Arabi magazine was first published, the magazine went on to become the most popular magazine in the Arab world. Many Arab writers moved to Kuwait for freedom of expression because Kuwait had greater freedom of expression than elsewhere in the Arab world. Kuwait was a haven for writers and journalists from all parts of the Middle East. The Iraqi poet Ahmed Matar left Iraq in the 1970s to take refuge in the more liberal environment of Kuwait.

Kuwaiti society embraced liberal and Western attitudes throughout the 1960s and 1970s. Most Kuwaiti women did not wear the hijab in the 1960s and 1970s. At Kuwait University, mini-skirts were more common than the hijab.

In the early 1980s, Kuwait experienced a major economic crisis after the Souk Al-Manakh stock market crash and decrease in oil price.

During the Iran–Iraq War, Kuwait supported Iraq. Throughout the 1980s, there were several terror attacks in Kuwait, including the 1983 Kuwait bombings, hijacking of several Kuwait Airways planes and attempted assassination of Emir Jaber in 1985. Kuwait was a leading regional hub of science and technology in the 1960s and 1970s up until the early 1980s, the scientific research sector significantly suffered due to the terror attacks.

The Kuwaiti government strongly advocated Islamism throughout the 1980s. At that time, the most serious threat to the continuity of Al Sabah came from home-grown secular democrats. The secular Kuwaiti opposition were protesting the 1976 suspension of the parliament. Al Sabah were attracted to Islamists preaching the virtues of a hierarchical order that included loyalty to the Kuwaiti monarchy. In 1981, the Kuwaiti government gerrymandered electoral districts in favor of the Islamists. Islamists were the government's main allies, hence Islamists were able to colonize state agencies, such as the government ministries. By the mid-1980s, Kuwait was described as an autocracy. In 1986, Emir Jaber suspended the parliament.

After the Iran–Iraq War ended, Kuwait declined an Iraqi request to forgive its US$65 billion debt. An economic rivalry between the two countries ensued after Kuwait increased its oil production by 40 percent. Tensions between the two countries increased further in July 1990, after Iraq complained to OPEC claiming that Kuwait was stealing its oil from a field near the Iraq–Kuwait border by slant drilling of the Rumaila field.

In August 1990, Iraqi forces invaded and annexed Kuwait. After a series of failed diplomatic negotiations, the United States led a coalition to remove the Iraqi forces from Kuwait, in what became known as the Gulf War. On 26 February 1991, the coalition succeeded in driving out the Iraqi forces. As they retreated, Iraqi forces carried out a scorched earth policy by setting oil wells on fire. During the Iraqi occupation, more than 1,000 Kuwaiti civilians were killed. In addition, more than 600 Kuwaitis went missing during Iraq's occupation, approximately 375 remains were found in mass graves in Iraq.

In March 2003, Kuwait became the springboard for the US-led invasion of Iraq. Upon the death of the Emir Jaber, in January 2006, Saad Al-Sabah succeeded him but was removed nine days later by the Kuwaiti parliament due to his ailing health. Sabah Al-Sabah was sworn in as Emir.

Geography

Kuwait City is located on Kuwait Bay, a natural deep-water harbor. 90% of Kuwait's population live within the Kuwait Bay coast. It has nine islands, all of which, with the exception of Failaka Island, are uninhabited. The land area is considered arable and sparse vegetation is found along its  coastline.

The resulting soil contamination due to oil and soot accumulation had made eastern and south-eastern parts of Kuwait uninhabitable. Sand and oil residue had reduced large parts of the Kuwaiti desert to semi-asphalt surfaces. The oil spills during the Gulf War also drastically affected Kuwait's marine resources.

Climate

Kuwait City has a hot desert climate (Köppen: BWh) with extremely hot, very prolonged summers and mild, short winters. It is one of the hottest cities in summer on Earth. Average summer high temperatures are above  for three months of the year, and during heat waves; the daytime temperature regularly exceeds  with nighttime lows often remaining above . In winter, nighttime temperatures frequently drop below . Considering its coastal position and relative distance to the equator in comparison with the hot desert climates in Africa and Saudi Arabia, the heat in the city is rather extreme - being surrounded in almost every direction by the hot desert.

Sand storms occur at times during summer from the shamal wind.  Sand storms can occur any time of year but occur mostly during summer, and less frequently during autumn.

Economy 

Kuwait has a petroleum-based economy, petroleum and fertilizers are the main export products. The Kuwaiti dinar is the highest-valued currency unit in the world. Petroleum accounts for 43% of GDP and 70% of export earnings. The Kuwait Stock Exchange is the second-largest stock exchange in the Arab world.

Culture

Theatre
Kuwait is known for its home-grown tradition of theatre. Kuwait is the only Arab country in the Persian Gulf region with a theatrical tradition. The Arabic theatrical movement in Kuwait constitutes a major part of the country's Arabic cultural life. Theatrical activities in Kuwait began in the 1920s when the first spoken dramas were released. Theatre activities are still popular today.

Soap operas

Kuwaiti soap operas (المسلسلات الكويتية) are among the most-watched soap operas in the Arab world. Most Gulf soap operas are based in Kuwait. Although usually performed in the Kuwaiti dialect, some Kuwaiti soap operas were successful as far away as Tunisia.

Sports

The city is home to the Al Kuwait SC, which has traditionally provided Kuwait's national basketball team with key players.

From 13 to 15 February 2020 it held the first Aquabike World Championship Grand Prix of Kuwait

Notable people
 Diana Karazon (born 1983), Kuwaiti-born Jordanian singer
 Rania Al-Abdullah (born 1970 as Rania Al-Yassin), Kuwaiti-born queen consort of Jordan
 Mishary Rashid Alafasy, Qari, imam, preacher and Nasheed artist
 Abdulfattah Owainat (born 1972), Kuwaiti-born Palestinian singer and songwriter
 Saleem Haddad (born 1983), Kuwaiti author and aid worker
 Yasser Al-Masri (born 1970, died 2018), Kuwaiti-born Jordanian actor
 Khaled Mazeedi (born 1986), Kuwaiti media magnate, internet entrepreneur, author, philanthropist
 Abdulhussain Abdulredha (15 July 1939 – 11 August 2017), Kuwaiti actor
 Nura Habib Omer (born 1988), German rapper of Eritrean and Saudi descent
 Omar Jarun (born 1983), former footballer and currently an assistant coach for Atlanta United 2
 Adline Castelino (born 1998), model, represented India in the Miss Universe 2020 pageant

See also

 List of twin towns and sister cities in Asia#Kuwait

References

External links

 
Populated places in Kuwait
Capitals in Asia
Populated coastal places in Kuwait
Port cities and towns in Kuwait
Port cities and towns of the Persian Gulf
Populated places established in 1613